Fatemi may refer to:

 Hossein Fatemi, Iranian scholar, journalist, and politician
 Hossein Fatemi (photographer), Iranian photographer
 Hossein Fatemi (psychiatrist), American-Iranian psychiatrist and professor of psychiatry at the University of Minnesota
 Mohammad Amin Fatemi, a noted Afghan physician and politician
 Faraz Fatemi, Iranian footballer 
 Mehrab Fatemi, Iranian Strongman and Powerlifter